WIOL may refer to:

 WIOL (AM), a radio station (1580 AM) licensed to Columbus, Georgia, United States
 WIOL-FM, a radio station (95.7 FM) licensed to Waverly Hall, Georgia, United States
 WKZJ, a radio station (92.7 FM) licensed to Eufaula, Alabama, United States, which used the call sign WIOL from 1999 until 2005
 WKVL, a radio station (850 AM) licensed to Knoxville, Tennessee, United States, which used the call sign WIOL from 1997 until 1998